Smokin Wanjala is a Kenyan lawyer and a justice of the Supreme Court of Kenya. He holds a Ph.D. in law from University of Ghent, Belgium. He also holds a Master of Laws degree from the Columbia University in the United States and a Bachelor of Laws (LLB) degree from the University of Nairobi. Wanjala lectured at the University of Nairobi for 15 years, where he taught international law, international human rights law, land law and criminal law.

Anti-corruption work 
Wanjala served as a deputy director in charge of prevention of the now defunct Kenya Anti-Corruption Commission. He was appointed to the position on 9 September 2004 for a period of five years and was responsible for Research, Policy and Preventive Service. He resigned on 18 September 2009 due to public outcry following the irregular reappointment alongside his boss Aaron Ringera and fellow deputy director Fatuma Sichale by President Mwai Kibaki.

Wanjala regularly lectured at the International Anti-Corruption Academy (IACA) in Laxenburg, Austria.

Appointment to the Supreme Court
In June 2012, he was among five justices nominated  to the inaugural bench of the Supreme Court of Kenya by the Judicial Service Commission (Kenya) which had interviewed 25 applicants.

Supreme Court career 

When the first round of the presidential election took place on March 4, 2013, it resulted in the two frontrunners, Uhuru of Jubilee and Raila of CORD, clinching 50.6% and 43.7% of the vote respectively. Uhuru Kenyatta was declared the president-elect of Kenya by the Independent Electoral and Boundaries Commission. Raila Odinga challenged this in the Supreme Court of Kenya. Wanjala was one of the six judges who dismissed the petition on March 30, 2013. The highly awaited verdict, given amid great tension in the country, was rendered  in favour of Uhuru Kenyatta and was unanimous.

In September 2017, he was one of four judges who voted to nullify President Uhuru Kenyatta's win in the August 2017 presidential election.

On September 5th, he was one of the judges of the Supreme Court Of Kenya to uphold the election of Dr. William Samoei Ruto as the president-elect of Kenya where Raila (the Petitioner) was against his win.

Bibliography
 The Anatomy of Corruption in Kenya: Legal, Political and Socio-economic Perspectives

See also
 Supreme Court of Kenya

References

Living people
20th-century Kenyan lawyers
21st-century Kenyan judges
1960 births